International Investment Group (IIG) is an American financial institution that specializes in short-term trade finance and commercial finance with a focus on emerging markets.  Through its affiliate IIG Capital it is instrumental in providing financing to small- and medium-sized merchants, traders and processors with a need for supply chain financing.

Founders 
The company was confounded by David Hu and Martin Silver. Later David Hu was sentenced to 12 years in prison for running a scam and defrauding customers of over $120 million.

Background 
The company is headquartered in New York City, and has representatives around the world. It serves clients internationally.  The company primarily focuses on facilitating the financing of trade transactions involving commodities that can be hedged and liquidated easily. These transactions are often between sellers in emerging markets and large companies in developed markets.  The company uses a structure it developed called “transactional equity,” in which the firm helps fund the down payment required from a merchant seeking financing from a bank. This enables the merchant to qualify for the bank financing.

Another of its affiliates IIG Bank Malta, provides private banking, wealth management, corporate banking and trade finance in Malta.

References

Investment management companies of the United States